Needville is a city in Fort Bend County, Texas, United States. It is within the  metropolitan area. The population was 3,089 at the 2020 census.

History

August Schendel founded the town of Schendelville in 1891 that contained his house, a store and a cotton gin. In 1894, he applied for a post office using the name "Needmore" as a joke, since they always needed more of everything. Due to Needmore, Texas already existing, the post office amended the name to "Needville".

By 1898, Schendel had officially platted a town and begun selling lots. A school had been constructed in 1897. By 1903, Needville had a school for white children with one teacher and 97 pupils, and one school for black children with one teacher and 45 pupils. The Round Hall building had been built about 1910 for dances and other social activities, and remained in this service until the 1950s.

Needville had three general stores, two cotton gins, a movie theater, and a population of 100 in 1914. Telephone service arrived in 1916. In 1918, the Needville State Bank opened and the Galveston, Harrisburg and San Antonio Railway built a line through the town. In 1920, Needville reported having a population of 500. It also reported having 12 general stores, four churches, four gins, and an electric power generation plant. 

From 1927 through 1931, the Fort Bend county fair was held in Needville. It was then discontinued because of the Great Depression, which caused the fair to run heavily into debt. Natural gas was piped into town in 1929. FM 36 was completed  in 1932, allowing all-weather access to Needville. Thereafter, a local school bus transported high school students to schools in Richmond and Rosenberg. Needville formed its own Independent School District (I.S.D.) in 1946 and opened its own high school in 1948. Needville I.S.D. opened a new elementary school in 1960. Integration of black and white schools was completed in 1966.

Geography

Needville is located in southern Fort Bend County at  (29.398232, –95.839880). Texas State Highway 36 passes through the city, leading north  to Rosenberg and southeast  to West Columbia. Farm to Market Road 360 starts at SH 36 and heads northwest to Beasley, while Farm to Market Road 1236 goes southwest then southeast. Needville-Fairchilds Road connects with the community of Fairchilds to the northeast.

Demographics

As of the 2020 United States census, there were 3,089 people, 1,245 households, and 929 families residing in the city.

As of the census of 2000, there were 2,609 people, 926 households, and 688 families residing in the city. The population density was 1,532.5 people per square mile (592.6/km2). There were 979 housing units at an average density of 575.1 per square mile (222.3/km2). The racial makeup of the city was 74.09% White, 13.19% African American, 0.27% Native American, 0.11% Asian, 10.23% from other races, and 2.11% from two or more races. Hispanic or Latino of any race were 23.96% of the population.

The median income for a household in the city was $41,202, and the median income for a family was $48,824. Males had a median income of $35,200 versus $26,389 for females. The per capita income for the city was $17,802. About 8.9% of families and 11.5% of the population were below the poverty line, including 16.8% of those under age 18 and 18.8% of those age 65 or over.

Government and infrastructure
The United States Postal Service Needville Post Office is located at 3000 School Street.

Fort Bend County does not have a hospital district. OakBend Medical Center serves as the county's charity hospital with which the county contracts.

Events

 The Needville Harvest Festival, founded in 1983, is held every October. The festival is organized by NHF, Inc. to draw visitors to Needville in the hope of stimulating local business, to raise funds for community development, and to fund annual scholarships for local high school students. 2006 performance by Aaron Watson.
 The Needville Citywide Garage Sale is held in March and September each year. There is no website as the participants are homeowners and businesses. Information with a map is normally available at Kinfolks Antiques at (979) 793-7200. Dates can be found on the Chamber of Commerce calendar of events.

Education

Needville is zoned to schools in the Needville Independent School District.  High school students go to Needville High School.  Needville's Albert George Branch Library is a part of the Fort Bend County Libraries system.

Some addresses not in Needville with "Needville, TX" addresses are zoned to B.F. Terry High School in Rosenberg, a part of Lamar CISD.

The designated community college for Needville ISD (as well as LCISD) is Wharton County Junior College.

Public libraries
Albert George Branch Library of Fort Bend County Libraries is in Needville. The library, which opened in November 1974, was named after Fort Bend County philanthropist Albert George. The Needville Chamber of Commerce and the Needville Lion's Club donated the land for the library. Originally the library, with its first portion designed by Wylie W. Vale & Associates, had  of space. In 1997 the library system used bond funds to expand and renovate the library; the library gained a new entrance, a meeting room, and new toilet facilities. The library now has  of space.

Parks and recreation
Fort Bend County operates the Barbara Jordan Park in Needville.

Nearby:
 George Ranch Historical Park, educational center
 Brazos Bend State Park and George Observatory

Business

Notable people
Dennis Gaubatz, NFL linebacker
Earnest Jackson, NFL running back

Notes

References

External links

 City of Needville official website
 Needville Area Chamber of Commerce
 George Ranch Historical Park photos, hosted by The Portal to Texas History

Cities in Texas
Cities in Fort Bend County, Texas